The 2017–18 A-League was the 41st season of top-flight soccer in Australia, and the 13th since the establishment of the A-League in 2004. The season began on 6 October 2017 and ended with the Grand Final on 5 May 2018.

Sydney FC won the A-League minor premiership, while Melbourne Victory won the Championship after defeating the Newcastle Jets 1–0 in the Grand Final on 5 May 2018.

Clubs

Personnel and kits

Managerial changes

Transfers

Foreign players
 
The following do not fill a Visa position:
1Those players who were born and started their professional career abroad but have since gained Australian citizenship (and New Zealand citizenship, in the case of Wellington Phoenix);
2Australian citizens (and New Zealand citizens, in the case of Wellington Phoenix) who have chosen to represent another national team;
3Injury Replacement Players, or National Team Replacement Players;
4Guest Players (eligible to play a maximum of fourteen games)

Salary cap exemptions and captains

Regular season

League table

Results

Finals series

Elimination-finals

Semi-finals

Grand Final

Statistics

Attendances

By club
These are the attendance records of each of the teams at the end of the home and away season. The table does not include finals series attendances.

By round

Club membership

Player stats

Top scorers

Hat-tricks

Own goals

Clean sheets

Discipline
During the season each club is given fair play points based on the number of cards they received in games. A yellow card is worth 1 point, a second yellow card is worth 2 points, and a red card is worth 3 points. At the annual awards night, the club with the fewest  points wins the Fair Play Award.

Awards

The following end of the season awards were announced at the 2017–18 Dolan Warren Awards night on 30 April 2018.
 Johnny Warren Medal – Adrian Mierzejewski, Sydney FC
 NAB Young Footballer of the Year – Daniel Arzani, Melbourne City
 Nike Golden Boot Award – Bobô, Sydney FC (27 goals)
 Goalkeeper of the Year – Jamie Young, Brisbane Roar
 Coach of the Year – Graham Arnold, Sydney FC
 Fair Play Award – Sydney FC
 Referee of the Year – Jarred Gillett
 Goal of the Year – Andrew Nabbout, Newcastle Jets (Western Sydney Wanderers v Newcastle Jets, 16 February 2018)

See also

 2017–18 Adelaide United FC season
 2017–18 Brisbane Roar FC season
 2017–18 Central Coast Mariners FC season
 2017–18 Melbourne City FC season
 2017–18 Melbourne Victory FC season
 2017–18 Newcastle Jets FC season
 2017–18 Perth Glory FC season
 2017–18 Sydney FC season
 2017–18 Wellington Phoenix FC season
 2017–18 Western Sydney Wanderers FC season

References

 
A-League Men seasons
Aus
1
1